Shyam Nandan Sahay was an Indian landlord, educationist, legislator and the founder vice chancellor of Babasaheb Bhimrao Ambedkar Bihar University. Born in the Indian state of Bihar, he also served as the vice chancellor of Patna University. He was a member of the 1st Lok Sabha, elected from Muzaffarpur Central constituency on Indian National Congress candidature. He won from Muzaffarpur again in 1957 but died in the same year. The Government of India awarded him the third highest civilian honour of the Padma Bhushan, in 1957, for his contributions to education. A road in Muzaffarpur is named after him.

See also 
 Indian general election, 1951–52

References

External links 
 
 

Recipients of the Padma Bhushan in literature & education
Year of birth missing
Year of death missing
Scholars from Bihar
Lok Sabha members from Bihar
Indian National Congress politicians from Bihar
Academic staff of Patna University
People from Muzaffarpur district